Highway City is an unincorporated community in Fresno County, California.

A post office opened in Highway City in 1951.

A portion of the area has been incorporated in Fresno. It is located near the junction of State Route 99 and Shaw Avenue, one of the main streets of Fresno. The community was once known as Biola Junction. It was bisected by the realignment of US Route 99 which opened in 1960. The Highway City Community Center is located in a small public park just north of Shaw Avenue.

The name Highway City was first applied by fig grower J. C. Forkner and was used as a railroad shipping center for his Golden State Highway Fig Gardens concern.

References

Unincorporated communities in California
Unincorporated communities in Fresno County, California